Boris Mikhailovich Bim-Bad (28 December 1941 – 1 March 2023) was a Soviet and Russian teacher and member of the Russian Academy of Education. Bim-Bad, who had an EdD, was a professor and member of the International Philosophical and Cosmological Society.

Biography
Bim-Bad was born in the family of Mikhail Isaakovich Bim-Bad (1901–1960). His uncle, Professor Max Isaakovich Bim-Bad (1914–1996), was the founder and first head of the Department of Economics of road facilities of the Moscow Automobile and Road Institute.

Bim-Bad was a graduate of Moscow State Pedagogical Institute and the Rector of the Russian Open University, later transformed into the University of the Russian Academy of Education.

From 2001 to 2002, he was leading the game show I Know Everything! on channel TV-6.
In his opinion, "atheism is a faith, but a savage".

Bim-Bad died on 1 March 2023, at the age of 81.

References

External links
 
 
 
 Гость программы Борис Михайлович Бим-Бад, академик Российской Академии образования, педагог.
 От Ленина до Бен-Ладена – один шаг?

1941 births
2023 deaths
People from Orenburg Oblast
Russian Jews
Russian anthropologists
Soviet anthropologists
Russian educators
Soviet Jews
Moscow State Pedagogical University alumni
Academicians of the Russian Academy of Education
Educators of the deaf
Russian television presenters
Rectors of universities in Russia
20th-century Russian Jews
21st-century Russian Jews